Francisco Carle Airport  is a high-elevation regional airport serving Jauja, in the Junin Region of Peru, and surrounding cities such as Huancayo and Tarma. It is currently served by two scheduled airlines. The airport terminal and runways have undergone expansion to accommodate larger aircraft. Travelers to domestic and international destinations connect in Lima's Jorge Chávez International Airport.

Airlines and destinations

Accidents & Incidents 
 On 28 March 2017 Peruvian Airlines Flight 112, operated by Boeing 737-300 (registration OB-2036-P) landing at Francisco Carle Airport swerved off the runway while landing and caught fire. All 141 onboard survived the accident.

See also
Transport in Peru
List of airports in Peru

References

External links
OurAirports - Jauja
SkyVector - Francisco Carle
OpenStreetMap - Jauja

Airports in Peru
Buildings and structures in Junín Region